Jana Krause (born 10 June 1987) is a German handball goalkeeper. She plays for the club Thüringer HC, and on the German national team. She represented Germany at the 2013 World Women's Handball Championship in Serbia.

Honours
Bundesliga:
Winner: 2007, 2008
EHF Challenge Cup:
Winner: 2010

References

External links
Profile at the Thüringer HC official website

German female handball players
1987 births
Living people
Sportspeople from Munich